This is a list of day-by-day summaries of the 2017 US Open.

Day 1 (August 28) 
 Seeds out:
 Men's Singles:  Jack Sock [13],  David Ferrer [21],  Karen Khachanov [25],  Robin Haase [32]
 Women's Singles:  Simona Halep [2],  Johanna Konta [7],  Ana Konjuh [21],  Kiki Bertens [24],  Lauren Davis [32]
 Schedule of Play

Day 2 (August 29) 
 Seeds out:
 Women's Singles:  Angelique Kerber [6],  Lesia Tsurenko [28]
 Schedule of Play

Day 3 (August 30) 
 Seeds out:
 Men's Singles:  Alexander Zverev [4],  Jo-Wilfried Tsonga [8],  Nick Kyrgios [14],  Gilles Müller [19],  Albert Ramos Viñolas [20],  Fabio Fognini [22],  Richard Gasquet [26],  Pablo Cuevas [27]
 Women's Singles:  Caroline Wozniacki [5],  Dominika Cibulková [11],  Kristina Mladenovic [14],  Anastasia Pavlyuchenkova [19],  Peng Shuai [22],  Anett Kontaveit [26],  Mirjana Lučić-Baroni [29]
 Schedule of Play

Day 4 (August 31) 
 Seeds out:
 Men's Singles:  Grigor Dimitrov [7],  Tomáš Berdych [15]
 Women's Singles:  Svetlana Kuznetsova [8],  Barbora Strýcová [23],  Daria Gavrilova [25]
 Men's Doubles:  Raven Klaasen /  Rajeev Ram [7],  Ryan Harrison /  Michael Venus [8]
 Women's Doubles:  Anna-Lena Grönefeld /  Květa Peschke [8],  Abigail Spears /  Katarina Srebotnik [10],  Makoto Ninomiya /  Renata Voráčová [15]
 Schedule of Play

Day 5 (September 1) 
 Seeds out:
 Men's Singles:  Marin Čilić [5],  John Isner [10]
 Women's Singles:  Caroline Garcia [18],  Magdaléna Rybáriková [31]
 Men's Doubles:  Łukasz Kubot /  Marcelo Melo [2],  Pierre-Hugues Herbert /  Nicolas Mahut [3],  Rohan Bopanna /  Pablo Cuevas [10],  Brian Baker /  Nikola Mektić [13],  Santiago González /  Donald Young [15],  Sam Groth /  Aisam-ul-Haq Qureshi [16]
 Mixed Doubles:  Sania Mirza /  Ivan Dodig [2],  Casey Dellacqua /  Rajeev Ram [5],  Andrea Hlaváčková /  Édouard Roger-Vasselin [6]
 Schedule of Play

Day 6 (September 2) 
 Seeds out:
 Men's Singles:  Roberto Bautista Agut [11],  Gaël Monfils [18],  Adrian Mannarino [30],  Feliciano López [31]
 Women's Singles:  Agnieszka Radwańska [10],  Jeļena Ostapenko [12],  Elena Vesnina [17],  Zhang Shuai [27]
 Women's Doubles:  Ashleigh Barty /  Casey Dellacqua [6],  Nao Hibino /  Alicja Rosolska [16]
 Schedule of Play

Day 7 (September 3)
 Seeds out:
 Men's Singles:  Lucas Pouille [16],  Mischa Zverev [23]
 Women's Singles:  Garbiñe Muguruza [3],  Julia Görges [30]
 Men's Doubles:  Ivan Dodig /  Marcel Granollers [6],  Julio Peralta /  Horacio Zeballos [14]
 Women's Doubles:  Kristina Mladenovic /  Anastasia Pavlyuchenkova [13]
 Schedule of Play

Day 8 (September 4)
 Seeds out:
 Men's Singles:  Dominic Thiem [6],  David Goffin [9],  Philipp Kohlschreiber [33]
 Women's Singles:  Elina Svitolina [4]
 Men's Doubles:  Oliver Marach /  Mate Pavić [9]
 Women's Doubles:  Ekaterina Makarova /  Elena Vesnina [1],  Kiki Bertens /  Johanna Larsson [11],  Hsieh Su-wei /  Monica Niculescu [12]
 Mixed Doubles:  Gabriela Dabrowski /  Rohan Bopanna [7]
 Schedule of Play

Day 9 (September 5)
 Seeds out:
 Men's Singles:  Sam Querrey [17],  Diego Schwartzman [29]
 Women's Singles:  Petra Kvitová [13],  Anastasija Sevastova [16]
 Men's Doubles:  Jamie Murray /  Bruno Soares [4]
 Women's Doubles:  Andreja Klepač /  María José Martínez Sánchez [14]
 Mixed Doubles:  Tímea Babos /  Bruno Soares [4],  Lucie Hradecká /  Marcin Matkowski [8]
 Schedule of Play

Day 10 (September 6)
 Seeds out:
 Men's Singles:  Roger Federer [3]
 Women's Singles:  Karolína Plíšková [1]
 Women's Doubles:  Gabriela Dabrowski /  Xu Yifan [9]
 Schedule of Play

Day 11 (September 7)
 Seeds out:
 Women's Singles:  Venus Williams [9],  CoCo Vandeweghe [20]
 Men's Doubles:  Henri Kontinen /  John Peers [1],  Bob Bryan /  Mike Bryan [5]
 Women's Doubles:  Tímea Babos /  Andrea Hlaváčková [5]
 Schedule of Play

Day 12 (September 8)
 Seeds out:
 Men's Singles:  Pablo Carreño Busta [12],  Juan Martín del Potro [24]
 Men's Doubles:  Feliciano López /  Marc López [11]
 Women's Doubles:  Lucie Šafářová /  Barbora Strýcová [3],  Sania Mirza /  Peng Shuai [4]
 Schedule of Play

Day 13 (September 9)
 Seeds out:
 Women's Singles:  Madison Keys [15]
 Mixed Doubles:  Chan Hao-ching /  Michael Venus [3]
 Schedule of Play

Day 14 (September 10)
 Seeds out:
 Men's Singles:  Kevin Anderson [28]
 Women's Doubles:  Lucie Hradecká /  Kateřina Siniaková [7]
 Schedule of Play

Day-by-day summaries
US Open (tennis) by year – Day-by-day summaries